Deer Park is a hamlet and census-designated place (CDP) in the Town of Babylon, in Suffolk County, on Long Island, in New York, United States. The population was 27,745 at the 2010 census.

History
Deer Park is located in the pine barrens in the northeast corner of the town of Babylon. It grew out of Jacob Conklin's 1610 settlement of the Half Way Hollow Hills, later known as Wheatley Heights. Charles Wilson started what is now Deer Park in 1853 about eleven years after the Long Island Rail Road arrived in 1842-when he established a large and productive farm. A post office was opened in 1851, closed in 1872 and re-opened on July 1, 1873. Deer Park had an elementary school in 1874. Prior to 1923, the Deer Park School District took in Deer Park and Wyandanch.

Farming was a staple of this small town for most of its history. Known as the "fruit basket" of New York state, the area was also famed for its dahlia cultivation. It was not until the effects of the post-World War II boom reached Deer Park that its economy ceased to be agricultural.

Deer Park had two industries before 1940: the Walker and Conklin firm baked red bricks in West Deer Park (now Wheatley Heights), and the Golden Pickle Works (1902) prepared pickles in Deer Park. Deer Park was the locale of the Edgewood State Hospital (1938–1969)-originally a tuberculosis sanatorium, and later an Army hospital during World War II. The Fairchild Engine and Airplane Corporation established a factory in Deer Park in 1956.

In 1946, the former Deer Park Airport opened. It operated until 1974; the land was subsequently redeveloped.

Deer Park is reputed to have been the favorite summer spot of President John Quincy Adams, as his preferred vacation destination from 1835 until his death. However, this "fact" has never been verified.

On October 22, 2008, the $300 million Tanger Outlets at the Arches shopping mall opened.

Geography

Deer Park is located in the northeastern corner of the town of Babylon. It is bordered to the west by the Babylon hamlets of Wyandanch and Wheatley Heights, to the north by Dix Hills in the Town of Huntington, to the east by Brentwood and Baywood in the town of Islip, and to the south by the hamlet of North Babylon.

Demographics

Demographics for the CDP

Census 2000 
As of the census of 2000, there were 28,316 people, 9,516 households, and 7,422 families residing in the CDP. The population density was 4,525.0 per square mile (1,746.5/km2). There were 9,698 housing units at an average density of 1,549.8/sq mi (598.2/km2). The racial makeup of the CDP was 89.6% White, 3.0% African American, 0.1% Native American, 1.9% Asian, 0.0% Pacific Islander, 2.1% from other races, and 2.3% from two or more races. Hispanic or Latino of any race were 7.6% of the population.

There were 9,516 households, out of which 34.3% had children under the age of 18 living with them, 62.7% were married couples living together, 11.8% had a female householder with no husband present, and 22.0% were non-families. 18.1% of all households were made up of individuals, and 8.8% had someone living alone who was 65 years of age or older. The average household size was 2.97 and the average family size was 3.37.

In the CDP, the population was spread out, with 25.2% under the age of 18, 6.6% from 18 to 24, 32.4% from 25 to 44, 21.7% from 45 to 64, and 14.2% who were 65 years of age or older. The median age was 37 years. For every 100 females, there were 94.3 males. For every 100 females age 18 and over, there were 89.5 males.

The median income for a household in the CDP was $61,254, and the median income for a family was $67,128 (these figures had risen to $72,173 and $87,500 respectively as of a 2007 estimate). Males had a median income of $47,266 versus $32,743 for females.  The per capita income for the CDP was $24,196. About 3.3% of families and 4.7% of the population were below the poverty line, including 5.3% of those under age 18 and 5.6% of those age 65 or over.

2010 census 
As of 2010, the population was 27,745. The demographics were as follows:
 White alone - 18,755 (67.6%)
 Hispanic - 3,364 (12.1%)
 Black alone - 3,182 (11.5%)
 Asian alone - 1,871 (6.7%)
 Two or more races - 466 (1.7%)
 Other race alone - 70 (0.3%)
 American Indian alone - 37 (0.1%)

23.2% of the population was under 18, and the median age was 40.7.

Notable organizations
The Long Island Board of Rabbis, an organization of Conservative, Orthodox, Reform, and Reconstructionist rabbis on Long Island, has had its headquarters in Deer Park.

Notable people 

 Dan Barry, reporter, The New York Times
 Rodney Dangerfield, comedian
 Kathleen Herles, voice actor

References

External links

 Babylon Beacon, local newspaper

Babylon (town), New York
Census-designated places in New York (state)
Hamlets in New York (state)
Census-designated places in Suffolk County, New York
Hamlets in Suffolk County, New York